Patrick J. Falloon (born September 22, 1972) is a Canadian former professional ice hockey right winger who played nine seasons in the National Hockey League between 1991 and 2000. He played with the San Jose Sharks, Philadelphia Flyers, Ottawa Senators, Edmonton Oilers, and Pittsburgh Penguins. He would also play a season in the Swiss National League. The first player drafted by the Sharks, Falloon had a standout junior career with the Spokane Chiefs of the Western Hockey League, with consecutive 60 goal seasons before being drafted.

Playing career
Falloon was named Memorial Cup Tournament MVP in 1991 with the Spokane Chiefs of the WHL.

Falloon was drafted 2nd overall by the San Jose Sharks in the 1991 NHL Entry Draft. He was the first-ever draft pick in the history of the San Jose Sharks organization. Ray Whitney, his teammate with the WHL's Spokane Chiefs, was the Sharks' second pick. The Sharks had thought the pair would be a natural scoring combination, but that didn't pan out. After playing in San Jose for four years, Falloon was traded November 16, 1995 to the Philadelphia Flyers in exchange for LW Martin Spanhel, a first-round draft choice in the 1996 Entry Draft and a third-round draft choice (these picks were later transferred to the Phoenix Coyotes and Buffalo Sabres and used to acquire Danny Briere and Mike Martone, respectively).

He was traded January 17, 1998 to the Ottawa Senators along with Václav Prospal and a second-round draft choice, in exchange for Alexandre Daigle, the first overall draft pick in 1993.  He later played for both the Edmonton Oilers and Pittsburgh Penguins.

After 2000, he was no longer an active NHL player. After playing for Davos in Switzerland for the 2000–2001 season, Falloon returned home to play in his hometown, for the Foxwarren Falcons – a team from the tiny North Central Hockey League in western Manitoba. Not surprisingly, he was a top scorer in the league.  With the Falcons, he helped them win six straight league championships from 2001–02 to 2006–07 (the Falcons also won without Falloon in 2000–01).  This string of championships was broken in 2007–08 by the Roblin Northstars.

As the second overall pick, Falloon will probably always be remembered as the 'consolation prize' in the 1991 draft, since No. 1 pick Eric Lindros was easily the most coveted player available that year. Still, Falloon was considered a talented prospect in his own right, and the Sharks expected him to be one of the building blocks of their young franchise in the coming decade. Falloon delivered decent returns as a rookie, notching 59 points in 1991–92, but never topped that production for the remainder of his career, and is widely regarded as a draft bust. Future Hockey Hall-of-Famers Scott Niedermayer and Peter Forsberg were selected with the third and sixth picks respectively after Falloon went second in the 1991 draft.
Later in his career Falloon became known more for his lack of conditioning. 

He played 575 career NHL games, scoring 143 goals and 179 assists for 322 points.

Career statistics

Regular season and playoffs

International

After hockey
Falloon continues  to be  a grain farmer with his family farm  after he retired from hockey.

Awards
 WHL West Second All-Star Team – 1989
 WHL West First All-Star Team – 1991

References

External links
 

1972 births
Living people
Canadian ice hockey right wingers
Edmonton Oilers players
HC Davos players
Ice hockey people from Manitoba
National Hockey League first-round draft picks
Ottawa Senators players
Philadelphia Flyers players
Pittsburgh Penguins players
San Jose Sharks draft picks
San Jose Sharks players
Spokane Chiefs players
Canadian expatriate ice hockey players in Switzerland